Amirabad-e Kord (also Romanized as Amīrābād-e Kord; also known as Amīrābād, Amīrābād-e ‘Alīqolī, and Amrābād Kurd) is a village in Jeyhun Dasht Rural District, Shara District, Hamadan County, Hamadan Province, Iran. At the 2006 census, its population was 332, in 80 families.

References 

Populated places in Hamadan County